Sathyapriya Bhavani Shankar (born 31 December 1989) known by her stage name Priya Bhavani, is an Indian actress and television presenter who primarily appears in Tamil films, in addition to a few Telugu films.She made her acting debut with commercially successful Tamil film Meyaadha Maan (2017).  

She has appeared in successful films such as Meyaadha Maan (2017), Kadaikutty Singam (2018), Mafia: Chapter 1 (2020), Yaanai (2022) and Thiruchitrambalam (2022).

Early life  
Priya Bhavani Shankar was born to Bhavani Shankar and Thangam Bhavani Shankar and she has an elder brother. She did her Schooling in SBOA Matriculation and Higher Secondary School, Chennai. She studied engineering in a college. After entering the media industry she earned her Master of Business Administration.

Career
Her first recognition was as a television news presenter at the Tamil news channel Puthiya Thalaimurai. She also worked as a serial actress in Star Vijay Television's Kalyanam Mudhal Kadhal Varai. In 2017, she  made her film debut with Meyaadha Maan opposite Vaibhav Reddy, for which she was nominated for a SIIMA Award for Best Female Debutant.

The following year, Priya appeared in Kadaikutty Singam alongside Karthi. In 2019, she starred in Monster alongside S. J. Suryah. In 2020 she was seen in Mafia: Chapter 1. She also appeared in the Amazon Prime web series Time Enna Boss.
In 2021, she starred in the multi-starrer Kalathil Sandhippom alongside Jiiva and Arulnithi, Kasada Thapara alongside Sundeep Kishan, and Oh Manapenne alongside Harish Kalyan. 

As of 2022, her projects include Yaanai alongside Arun Vijay, Kuruthi Aattam opposite Atharvaa, Bommai with S. J. Suryah for the second time, and Hostel opposite Ashok Selvan.Her next telugu project Kalyanam Kamaneeyam (2023 film) is slated to release on 14 January 2023.

Filmography

Films

Web series

Television

Awards and nominations

References

External links
 

Living people
Tamil television actresses
Actresses from Tamil Nadu
1989 births
People from Mayiladuthurai district
Actresses in Tamil television
Actresses in Tamil cinema
Indian television actresses
Indian film actresses
21st-century Indian actresses
Actresses in Telugu cinema